Events from the year 1520 in art.

Events
 Considered the start of the Mannerism art period
 The oldest known painting depicting Stockholm is painted in the church of Storkyrkan.

Works

Painting
Albrecht Altdorfer – Departure of Saint Florian
Domenico Campagnola – Gerolamo
Gerard David – The Virgin and Child in a landscape (approximate date)
Gerard David or circle of Jan Mabuse – Our Lady of the Fly (approximate date)
Il Garofalo – Ascension of Christ
Quentin Matsys – Portrait of a woman
Francesco Melzi – Flora
Raphael – Transfiguration
Titian – Venus Anadyomene (approximate date)
Lucas van Leyden – Lot and his Daughters (approximate date)
Jan van Scorel – Sippenaltar
 Pseudo Jan Wellens de Cock – Calvary (approximate date)
Portrait of Francis I of France (completed by this date)

Births
February 23 (baptised) - Ercole Procaccini the Elder, Italian painter mainly active in Milan (died 1595)
June 29 - Nicolás Factor, Spanish painter of the Renaissance period (died 1583)
date unknown
Gaspar Becerra, Spanish painter and sculptor (died 1570)
Leonardo Brescia, Italian painter (died 1582)
Mirabello Cavalori, Italian painter mainly active in Florence (died 1572)
Claudio de Arciniega, Spanish sculptor and architect (died 1593)
Giacomo del Duca, Italian sculptor (died 1601)
Étienne Dupérac, French painter, draughtsman and engraver, topographer and antiquarian (died 1607)
Giorgio Ghisi, Italian engraver from Mantua (died 1582)
David Kandel, Strasbourg-born botanical illustrator (died 1592)
Domenico Poggini, Italian sculptor (died 1590)
Giuseppe Porta, Italian painter active mainly in Venice (died 1575)
Martin Van Cleve, Flemish painter of the Van Cleve family (died 1570)
probable
Hans Eworth, Flemish painter (died 1574)
Marcus Gheeraerts the Elder, Flemish printmaker and painter associated with the English court of the mid-16th Century (died 1590)
Francesco Imparato, Italian painter active mainly in his natal city of Naples (died 1570)
Girolamo Porro, Italian engraver on wood and on copper (died unknown)
Martino Rota, Croatian artist and printmaker (died 1583)
Hugues Sambin, French sculptor and woodworker (died 1601)
(born 1520/1524): Giovanni Battista Moroni, Italian painter of the mannerist period (died 1579)

Deaths
April 6 - Raphael, Italian painter and architect of the High Renaissance (born 1483)
April 11 - Agostino Chigi, Italian banker and patron of the arts (born 1466)
December 6 - Bartolomé Ordóñez, Spanish sculptor (born 1480)
date unknown
Raffaello Botticini - Italian Renaissance painter (born 1474)
Sheikh Hamdullah, Ottoman master of Islamic calligraphy (born 1436)
Sultan Ali Mashhadi, Persian calligrapher and poet (born 1453)
Marx Reichlich, Austrian painter of primarily religious scenes (born 1460)
Niccolo Rondinelli, Italian painter active mainly in Ravenna (born 1468)

References

 
Years of the 16th century in art